De Nobili School may refer to several schools in India:

De Nobili School CTPS, Bokaro
De Nobili School, Maithon
De Nobili School, CMRI
De Nobili School, Bhuli
De Nobili School, Sijua
De Nobili School, Mugma
De Nobili School, Sindri
De Nobili School, FRI
De Nobili School, Gomoh